Scaphander is a genus of sea snails, marine gastropod molluscs in the family Scaphandridae, the canoe bubbles.

Species
Species within the genus Scaphander include:
 
 † Scaphander alaskensis Clark 1932 
 Scaphander andamanicus E. A. Smith, 1894
 Scaphander attenuatus Schepman, 1913
 Scaphander bathymophilus Dall, 1881
 † Scaphander brevicula Philippi 1887 
 Scaphander cancellatus E. von Martens, 1902
 Scaphander ceylanica E. A. Smith, 1904
 Scaphander clavus Dall, 1889
 Scaphander darius Marcus & Marcus, 1967
 † Scaphander dertonensis (Sacco, 1896) 
 Scaphander dilatatus A. Adams, 1862
 † Scaphander duseni 
 Scaphander edwardsii 
 Scaphander elegans 
 Scaphander elongatus A. Adams, 1862
 † Scaphander enysi (Hutton, 1873) 
 † Scaphander flemingi Marwick, 1965 
 Scaphander fortisi 
 Scaphander gracilis Watson, 1886
 Scaphander grandis (Minichev, 1967)
 Scaphander grateloupi 
 Scaphander ickei 
 Scaphander illecebrosus Iredale, 1925
 Scaphander imperceptus (Bouchet, 1975)
 Scaphander impunctatus Hickman 1980 
 Scaphander interruptus Dall, 1889 
 Scaphander japonicus Adams, 1862
 † Scaphander javanus Martin 1879 
 † Scaphander jugularis (Conrad, 1855) 
 † Scaphander komiticus Laws, 1939 
 Scaphander laetus Thiele, 1925
 Scaphander langdoni 
 Scaphander lignarius (Linnaeus, 1767)
 Scaphander lignarius lignarius (Linnaeus, 1758) - wood-grained canoe bubble
 † Scaphander malleatus Marwick, 1931 
 Scaphander meridionalis Siegwald, Pastorino, Oskars & Malaquias, 2020
 † Scaphander miriamae Dell, 1952 
 Scaphander mundus Watson, 1883 
 † Scaphander nannus Woodring 1928 
 Scaphander nobilis Verrill, 1884
 † Scaphander oligoturritus Sacco 1897 
 Scaphander otagoensis Dell, 1956
 Scaphander parisiensis 
 Scaphander planeticus Dall, 1908
 † Scaphander polysarcus Cossmann and Pissarro 1913 
 Scaphander primus 
 Scaphander punctostriatus (Mighels & C. B. Adams, 1842) - giant canoe-bubble
 Scaphander punnetostriatus 
 † Scaphander radii Abbass 1967 
 † Scaphander rarus Wade 1926 
 † Scaphander remondi Philippi 1887 
 Scaphander robustus Okutani, 1966
 † Scaphander scapha Laws, 1933 
 Scaphander sibogae Schepman, 1913
 † Scaphander stewarti Durham 1944 
 Scaphander subglobosus Schepman, 1913
 Scaphander sulcatinus A. Adams, 1862
 Scaphander takedai (Habe, 1981)
 † Scaphander tarbelliana (Grateloup, 1837) 
 Scaphander teramachii (Habe, 1954)
 † Scaphander toringa Dell, 1952 
 Scaphander vicinus E. A. Smith, 1906
 † Scaphander washingtonensis Tegland 1933 
 † Scaphander watsoni Dall, 1881
 Scaphander watsoni rehderi
 Scaphander willetti Dall, 1919

Species brought into synonymy
 Scaphander alatus''Dall, 1895: synonym of  Scaphander mundus Watson, 1883
 Scaphander brownii Leach, 1852: synonym of Scaphander lignarius (Linnaeus, 1758)
 Scaphander cumingii A. Adams, 1862: synonym of Philine cumingii (A. Adams, 1862) (original combination)
 Scaphander cylindrellus Dall, 1908: synonym of Cylichnium cylindrellum (Dall, 1908) (original combination)
 Scaphander fragilis (Habe, 1952): synonym of Eoscaphander fragilis Habe, 1952
 Scaphander gibbulus Jeffreys, 1856: synonym of Weinkauffia gibbula (Jeffreys, 1856): synonym of Weinkauffia turgidula (Forbes, 1844) (original combination)
 Scaphander giganteus Risso, 1826: synonym of Scaphander lignarius (Linnaeus, 1758)
 Scaphander librarius Lovén, 1846: synonym of Scaphander punctostriatus (Mighels & C. B. Adams, 1842)
 Scaphander loisae Bullis, 1956: synonym of Scaphander bathymophilus (Dall, 1881)
 Scaphander mulitstriata Brazier, 1877: synonym of Scaphander multistriatus Brazier, 1877: synonym of Scaphander japonicus A. Adams, 1862 (incorrect gender of species epithet)
 Scaphander multistriatus Brazier, 1877: synonym of Scaphander japonicus A. Adams, 1862
 Scaphander niveus R. B. Watson, 1883: synonym of Sabatia nivea (R. B. Watson, 1883) (original combination)
 Scaphander pilsbryi McGinty, 1955: synonym of Scaphander darius Marcus & Marcus, 1967
 Scaphander pustulosus Dall, 1895: synonym of Sabatia pustulosa Dall, 1895 (original combination)
 Scaphander sibogae (Schepman, 1913): synonym of Scaphander attenuatus Schepman, 1913 (invalid: junior secondary homonym of Scaphander sibogae Schepman, 1913)
 Scaphander stigmatica Dall, 1927: synonym of Scaphander nobilis Verrill, 1884
 Scaphander subglobosa Schepman, 1913: synonym of Scaphander subglobosus Schepman, 1913 (original spelling; incorrect gender agreement of specific epithet)
 Scaphander targionius Risso, 1826: synonym of Scaphander lignarius (Linnaeus, 1758)

References

 ZipCodeZoo
 Powell A. W. B., New Zealand Mollusca'', William Collins Publishers Ltd, Auckland, New Zealand 1979

External links
 Miocene Gastropods and Biostratigraphy of the Kern River Area, California; United States Geological Survey Professional Paper 642 
  Serge GOFAS, Ángel A. LUQUE, Joan Daniel OLIVER,José TEMPLADO & Alberto SERRA (2021) - The Mollusca of Galicia Bank (NE Atlantic Ocean); European Journal of Taxonomy 785: 1–114
 Siegwald, J., Oskars, T. R., Kano, Y. & Malaquias, M. A. E. (2022). A global phylogeny of the deep-sea gastropod family Scaphandridae (Heterobranchia: Cephalaspidea): Redefinition and generic classification. Molecular Phylogenetics and Evolution. 169: 107415

Scaphandridae